Mercury 2 or variants may refer to:

 Mercury 2, a spacecraft of Project Mercury
 Mercury(II), an oxidation state of the element Mercury
 Mercury II, a version of the Blackburn Mercury early British aircraft
 Mercury II, a 1928 version of the Bristol Mercury aircraft engine

See also
 Mercury (disambiguation)
 Mercury-Redstone 2, a 1961 space flight test
 Mercury-Atlas 2, a 1962 space flight test